Major General Prabath Dematanpitiya (also known as D.A.P.N Dematanpitiya) was the Chief of Staff of Sri Lanka Army.

He was also former General Officer Commanding, 56 Division Wanni (SFHQ-W) of the Sri Lanka Army.

Early life
Dematanpitiya was educated at Nalanda College Colombo and also a MSc Degree graduate of National Defence University, Pakistan in National Security and War Studies.

References

External links
 newly-promoted-major-generals-congratulated

Sri Lankan Buddhists
Sri Lankan major generals
Sinhalese military personnel
Sri Lanka Military Academy graduates
Sri Lanka Signals Corps officers
Alumni of Nalanda College, Colombo
Living people
Year of birth missing (living people)